Bullmore is a surname. Notable people with the surname include:

Amelia Bullmore (born 1964), British actress, screenwriter, and playwright
Edward Bullmore (born 1960), British neuropsychiatrist, neuroscientist, and academic
Herbert Bullmore (1874–1937), British rugby union player
William Bullmore (1912–1972), Canadian politician